Left Front may refer to:

Politics

Europe
 Left Front (Czechoslovakia) (Czech: Levá fronta), an organization of left-wing intellectuals founded in 1929
 Left Front (France) (French: Front de gauche), a French electoral alliance created for the 2009 European elections 
 Left Front (Russia) (Russian: Левый Фронт), a group in Russia that is critical of Vladimir Putin
 Left Front (Catalonia) (Catalan: Front d'Esquerres), an electoral alliance planned ahead of the 1977 Spanish general election

India

West Bengal 

Left Front (West Bengal) (Bengali: বামফ্রন্ট Bamfrônṭ), an alliance of parties in the Indian state of West Bengal
United Left Election Committee, an electoral alliance in West Bengal, India, formed ahead of the 1957 West Bengal Legislative Assembly election
United Left Front (1957), an electoral alliance formed ahead of the 1957 West Bengal Legislative Assembly Election
United Left Front (1962), an electoral alliance formed ahead of the 1962 West Bengal Legislative Assembly Election
United Left Front (1967), an electoral alliance formed ahead of the 1967 West Bengal Legislative Assembly Election
People's United Left Front, an electoral alliance in West Bengal, India, formed in December 1966, ahead of the 1967 West Bengal Legislative Assembly election

Others 

Left Front (Tripura), a political alliance in the Indian state of Tripura
Left Democratic Manch, a political alliance in the Indian state of Assam
Left Democratic Front (Kerala), a coalition of left-wing political parties in the state of Kerala, India
Left Democratic Front (Maharashtra), a coalition of left-wing political parties in the state of Maharashtra, India
Republican Left Democratic Front, a coalition of political parties in the Indian state of Maharashtra formed before the Maharashtra state assembly elections, 2009

Periodicals
 LEF (journal) (Russian: ЛЕФ), later called New LEF (Russian: Novyi LEF)
 Left Front (magazine) (1930–1934/5), an American magazine published by the Chicago chapter of the John Reed Club

See also
 Left Democratic Front (disambiguation)
 Left Revolutionary Front (disambiguation)
 United Left Front (disambiguation)